Naudedrillia nealyoungi is a species of sea snail, a marine gastropod mollusk in the family Pseudomelatomidae, the Turridae (turrids) and allies.

Description

Distribution
This marine species occurs off KwaZulu-Natal, South Africa.

References

 Kilburn R.N. (1988). Turridae (Mollusca: Gastropoda) of southern Africa and Mozambique. Part 4. Subfamilies Drillinae, Crassispirinae and Strictispirinae. Annals of the Natal Museum. 29(1): 167-320

External links
 

Endemic fauna of South Africa
nealyoungi
Gastropods described in 1988